TVP Sport is a Polish sport channel owned by TVP launched on 18 November 2006. The channel is available on Canal+, Cyfrowy Polsat, as well as over cable providers.

Broadcast
SD broadcasting via satellite (Eutelsat Hot Bird) stopped on 6 April 2017.

Broadcast rights 
Olympic Games

Athletics

European Athletics Championships
European Indoor Athletics Championships
World Athletics Championships
World Junior Championships in Athletics
Janusz Kusociński Memorial
Kamila Skolimowska Memorial
Pedros Cup

Cycling
UCI Road World Championships
UCI Mountain Bike & Trials World Championships
UCI Track Cycling World Championships
Tour de Pologne
Tour de Suisse
Arctic Race of Norway

Equestrian

Most important competitions in Poland

Football
UEFA Euro 2012
2014 FIFA World Cup
2015 FIFA Women's World Cup
UEFA Euro 2016
2018 FIFA World Cup
2018 FIFA Club World Cup
2019 Copa América
2019 FIFA Women's World Cup
UEFA Euro 2020
2022 FIFA World Cup
2023 FIFA Women's World Cup
UEFA Euro 2024
UEFA Champions League (only chosen matches)
UEFA Europa League
2018–19 UEFA Nations League
2020–21 UEFA Nations League
Ekstraklasa (only chosen matches)
Copa del Rey

Futsal

Futsal Ekstraklasa

Handball

Polish Superliga (men's handball)
Ekstraklasa (women's handball)
European Men's Handball Championship
European Women's Handball Championship
IHF World Men's Handball Championship
IHF World Women's Handball Championship

Ice hockey
National Hockey League
2016 World Cup of Hockey
IIHF World Championships
Champions Hockey League
Polish Ice Hockey League
Polish Cup

Speedway

Polish First League

Tennis

WTA Tournaments

Weightliftng

World Weightlifting Championships
European Weightlifting Championships
Polish Championships

Winter sports
 FIS Nordic World Ski Championships
 FIS Ski Jumping World Cup ( Only competitions in Poland and Romania ) 
 Biathlon World Cup

Logos

References

External links
 
 TVP Sport at LyngSat Address

Sports television in Poland
Television channels and stations established in 2006
Television channels in Poland